Ripley House may refer to:

United Kingdom
Ripley Castle, North Yorkshire
Ripley House, in Streatham Common, Lambeth, London

United States

Ripley Intaglios, listed on the NRHP in La Paz County, Arizona
Sam Ripley Farm, listed on the NRHP in Liberty County, Georgia
Lafayette G. Ripley House, a  Michigan State Historic Sites in Muskegon County, Michigan
Smith-Ripley House and museum, listed on the NRHP in Jefferson County, New York
Ripley House (Worthington, Ohio), listed on the NRHP in Franklin County, Ohio
Ripley Stone House, Afton, Tennessee, listed on the NRHP in Greene County, Tennessee
Ripley House, a community center in East End, Houston, Texas
Ripley House, part of the Grace and Pearl Historic District, listed on the NRHP in Walworth County, Wisconsin